The geology of Europe is varied and complex, and gives rise to the wide variety of landscapes found across the continent, from the Scottish Highlands to the rolling plains of Hungary. Europe's most significant feature is the dichotomy between highland and mountainous Southern Europe and a vast, partially underwater, northern plain ranging from England in the west to the Ural Mountains in the east. These two halves are separated by the Pyrenees and the Alps-Carpathians mountain chain. The northern plains are delimited in the west by the Scandinavian Mountains and the mountainous parts of the British Isles. The southern mountainous region is bounded by the Mediterranean Sea and the Black Sea. Major shallow water bodies submerging parts of the northern plains are the Celtic Sea, the North Sea, the Baltic Sea and the Barents Sea.

From the standpoint of plate tectonics, the ongoing northward drive of the African plate into the Eurasian plate in the Mediterranean basin is the most prominent aspect of the European scene today.  The pressure exerted by the African plate is the overall cause of the rise of the Pyrenees, the Alps and the Carpathian mountains.  Limestones and other sediments, the ancient floor of the Tethys Sea, are pushed high and now make up much of these ranges.  A submarine back-arc basin develops south of Italy, which is one of several Mediterranean mini-continental fragments caught between the two plates.  This buckling of the Earth's crust forces up Italy's mountains and stimulates active faults and volcanoes such as Mount Etna. Iberia, another separate terrain unit, has been rotated and emplaced against the rest of Europe by the plate collision.   

Moving north from the Alps and other ranges, tectonic activity largely fades away in the stable Baltic craton.  One exception to this trend is a hot spot, rising from the mantle underneath central Germany, which has been responsible in geologic time for volcanoes such as the Vogelsberg in Hesse and currently provides heat to hot springs and lakes in the region.

Weathering mantles made up of saprolite are common in Europe. Saprolite composition varies from kaolinitic and ferrallitic to grus. The first were formed in the Mesozoic and early Cenozoic while the latter in the late Cenozoic. Stripping of weathered rock has produced depressions occupied by numerous lakes in Finland and Sweden.

Components
Europe consists of the following cratons and terranes and microcontinents:
 the Baltica craton - Scandinavia, Finland, the Baltic states, Russia, northern Poland and northern Germany,
 Avalonian fragments - England, Ireland, Netherlands, northern Germany, etc.,
 Laurentian (North American) fragments - Western Norway and Scotland,
 Gondwana fragments - Spain, Italy, Malta, possibly belonging to the Cimmerian Arc,
 Neo-Tethys Ocean floor - the Pyrenees/Alps/Apennine/Balkan Alps/Carpathian complex,
 the Anatolian part of the Cimmerian Arc originating from Gondwana.

See also
Geography of Europe
European Cenozoic Rift System

External links
Geology of Europe
OneGeology-Europe
Maps showing the tectonic development of Europe

References